Trio was launched at New Brunswick in 1801 and sailed to England. She became a merchant ship trading between Dublin and Montreal. From 1805 new owners sought to employ her as a slave ship, but the French Navy captured her in January 1806 early in her first slave trading voyage.

Career and capture
Trio first entered Lloyd's Register (LR) in 1802.
 

Captain James Hassler sailed from Liverpool on 21 September 1805, bound for West Africa.

L'Hermite's squadron captured Trio in January off Sierra Leone. The French made a cartel of her and she arrived at Falmouth on 7 April 1806 with the crew of Favourite, which the French had captured on 6 January. She then sailed on to Plymouth. The entry for Trio in Lloyd's Register has the notation "captured" above her name.

Spilsbury's log
Francis P. Spilsbury was the surgeon aboard Favorite and he kept a log of her voyage to Africa. 

The French captured Trio on 22 January at Cape Mount. The French swept into the bay where they found Trio and three American vessels. Trio fired a gun and then struck. The French sold the female slaves Trio had gathered to the Americans and divided the male slaves among the French vessels. The French made a cartel of Trio, and on 24 January, after looting almost all the possessions of Favorites crew, put her crew on board Trio. The French also put on board the crews of Trio, Robert, of Liverpool, Hero, of Glasgow, Flora, of London, and Belle, of Greenock. L'Hermite provided sufficient provisions for 150 men for five days. On the 25th some of the men from the merchantmen became mutinous. Captain John Davie, of Favourite, read the Articles of War and gave the ringleaders 36 lashes each; this ended the mutiny. Trio had 160 men aboard and reached Freetown, Sierra Leone, on 2 February. Trio reached Crookhaven on 29 March where she took on provisions. However, Trios mate and surgeon deserted. Trio reached Falmouth on 8 April.

Post script
Under the rules governing cartels, Trio would probably have sailed on to France, carrying French prisoners in exchange for the British prisoners she had brought. Although the Registers continue to list Trio until 1810, the data is stale, unchanging from 1806.

Citations

References
 

1801 ships
Ships built in Canada
Age of Sail merchant ships of England
Liverpool slave ships
Captured ships